The Pasir Ris rail accident was a train accident that occurred on 22 March 2016, at the track switch near Pasir Ris MRT station in Pasir Ris, Singapore, on the East-West MRT Line. A C151 train struck two SMRT Trains trainee track workers at around 60 km/h, resulting in their deaths. The two deceased workers were working on a track point machine at that time as part of a team of 15 track personnel. This incident was "the worst train accident" in Singapore MRT's history.

SMRT Trains and one member of SMRT management were charged for violating the Workplace Safety and Health Act that led to this accident, and were fined $400,000 and $55,000 respectively. The SMRT engineer who led the track team at the scene of the accident was dismissed from SMRT Trains and charged with negligence causing death under the Penal Code. The SMRT engineer was thus jailed for four weeks.

Incident
The incident occurred at 11:10 a.m. on 22 March 2016, when a team of 15 track personnel was deployed to a track switch near Pasir Ris MRT station to investigate a high voltage alarm that indicated a possible track point fault. The team of 15 track workers walked in a single file towards the track point equipment to investigate the problem, and was granted track access. The two deceased workers, Nasrulhudin Majumudin and Muhammad Asyraf Ahmad Buhari, were second and third in the team walking as a file on the sidewalk near the third rail. Both were trainees in SMRT Trains. No speed restriction or ATC-code restriction was imposed on that section of track and there was no railway watchman to warn train captains of the presence of workers on track. The train involved, trainset 073/074 (a Kawasaki Heavy Industries C151), was operated in automatic mode under Westinghouse ATC and maintained a speed of 60 km/h.

The two deceased personnel, one supervisor, and at least one more track worker crossed over the third rail and onto the track to access the  signaling equipment. A senior officer in the team then noticed the train and yelled "Train is coming! The train is coming!". Members of the team tried to jump back into the sidewalk to seek refuge. The train driver noticed the track workers and applied the emergency brakes. However, the train struck both Nasrulhudin and Muhammad Asyraf. Nasrulhudin was crushed under the train, while Muhammad Asyraf was impacted by the train. Both personnel suffered multiple injuries and were pronounced dead at the scene. Service between Tanah Merah and Pasir Ris was suspended as a result for 2.5 hours, affecting 10,000 commuters.

Investigation
Investigations by SMRT revealed that there was no request to impose the safety code before the inspection team went on track to investigate the high voltage alarm. The engineer did not liaise with the duty station manager on when to impose the safety code and hence did not impose the safety code before the team was supposed to leave the station platform. The inspection team walked to the work site instead of taking a designated train to send them there.

A standard printed sign to warn train drivers that there are works in progress was not displayed but a handwritten sign was displayed with no indication of personnel working on track ahead.

Aftermath 
After an internal investigation, SMRT dismissed both the engineer who led the track team and the train driver involved at the scene of the accident. The sacking of both employees attracted online controversy, with Singaporeans on social media questioning whether it was fair to dismiss the train driver.

The engineer who led the inspection team was charged with negligence causing death under the Penal Code and was subsequently jailed for four weeks.

SMRT Trains and one member of SMRT management were then charged for violating the Workplace Safety and Health Act that led to this accident, and were fined $400,000 and $55,000 respectively.

References

2016 in Singapore
Accidents and incidents involving Mass Rapid Transit (Singapore)
Rail accidents and incidents in Singapore
2016 disasters in Singapore